Netechmodes landryi is a species of moth of the family Tortricidae. It is found in Pichincha Province, Ecuador.

The wingspan is 13 mm. The wings are yellowish white with dark rust brown markings. The hindwings are whitish.

Etymology
The species is named in honour of Dr. Bernard Landry, who first collected the species.

References

Moths described in 2004
Euliini